The Belmore Falls is a plunge waterfall with three drops on the Barrengarry Creek in the Southern Highlands and Illawarra regions of New South Wales, Australia.

Location and features

The falls were named after Somerset Lowry-Corry, 4th Earl Belmore the then-Governor of New South Wales.

See also

List of waterfalls of New South Wales

References

Waterfalls of New South Wales
Southern Highlands (New South Wales)
Illawarra escarpment
Plunge waterfalls